Jesse Remington High School in Candia, New Hampshire, is a private Christian school that offers a classical Christian education with project-based learning. The school was founded in 1992 by Jeffrey Philbrick under the auspices of Candia Congregational Church. The school's namesake, Jesse Remington, had been a pastor at the same church two hundred years prior, during the American War of Independence.

The school has an approximately 5 to 1 student teacher ratio, with an enrollment of no more than 55 students per year. Along with the core curriculum of Humanities, Math, Science, Language, and Bible, there are courses offered called Arts & Artisans, which are (but are not limited to) timber framing, stained glass, pottery, art, and weaving. The purpose of these classes is to teach life skills to students by allowing them to experience them first hand.

Yearly projects
Every year there are four major projects that each student will participate in. The first is the Faire, which is a school-wide reenactment of an historical age. These periods include the Renaissance, the Age of Enlightenment, the Victorian era, the Middle Ages, and recently the 20th century. During this time, each student is responsible to research one character from this era, and portrays that person as closely as possible to historical fact. In this way, students not only learn in-depth information about important historical figures, but they also teach anyone whom they meet on the Faire days. Upon completion of the Faire, students are required to write a research paper on their character, in order to cement their knowledge of that time period, and to teach basic writing skills. During this time freshman students are taught how to build work citation pages, as all grades are expected to cite all sources, and quotes.

The next project that students work on is Lights on the Hill, a Christmas-oriented school project that includes choirs, plays, puppet shows, cookie decorating, animal petting, and a cafeteria. During this time students are taught the biblical story of Christmas, and have the opportunity to make their school shine like a light on a hill.

In the second semester, students work on science projects, which are generally alumni-led classes that can range from Winter Ecology, to small engines workshops, and from bridges to running a sugar shack. During this class, students decide on the course they would like to take, and work on it from its beginning stages to its completion. 
    
The students in sugar shacking learn how to tap maple trees for their sap, and boil it to produce pure New Hampshire maple syrup.  Students in bridges learn the dynamics of building bridges and as a final project build paper bridges for a contest to see whose will stand the greatest amount of weight.  No matter what the choice is, students will be able to learn hands on by actually partaking in these types of events.

The final project of the school year is called "Celebration of the Arts".  This project is based around the study of arts and artisans which include drama, set design, timber framing, weaving, sewing, and painting. The result of this semester of projects is a play, often by Shakespeare, with beautifully painted scenes, and props, sewn dresses, scarves, and a picture display of timber frames built over the years by Jesse Remington students.

External links

School website

Christian schools in New Hampshire
Nondenominational Christian schools in the United States
Schools in Rockingham County, New Hampshire
Private high schools in New Hampshire
Candia, New Hampshire